Anbil Poyyamozhi  was an Indian politician and a former Member of the Legislative Assembly (MLA) of Tamil Nadu. He was a close confidant and friend of current Chief Minister of Tamil Nadu M. K. Stalin.

Poyyamozhi was elected to the Tamil Nadu legislative assembly from Tiruchirappalli - II constituency as a DMK candidate in the 1989 and 1996 elections. He was a son of the former Dravida Munnetra Kazhagam (DMK) minister Anbil P. Dharmalingam and the elder brother of Anbil Periyasamy, who was persuaded to contest the vacant Tiruchirapalli seat in the by-election resulting from Anbil Poyyamozhi's death. Poyyamozhi's son, Anbil Mahesh Poyyamozhi, was elected as the MLA for Thiruverumbur constituency in 2016 and also serves as the current Minister for School Education in Tamil Nadu from 2021.

References 

Dravida Munnetra Kazhagam politicians
1999 deaths
Tamil Nadu MLAs 1996–2001
Year of birth missing